Franklin County School serves pre-kindergarten through 12th grade at 1250 Highway 98
in Eastpoint, Franklin County, Florida, United States. The school's teams compete as the Seahawks. It is one of seven schools in the Franklin County School District (Florida).

Notable alumni

References

Educational institutions in the United States with year of establishment missing
Public K-12 schools in Florida
Schools in Franklin County, Florida